Jacques-Marie-Achille Ginoulhiac (born at Montpellier, department of Hérault, 3 December 1806; died there 17 November 1875) was a French bishop.

Biography
Immediately after his ordination to the priesthood (1830) he was appointed professor in the seminary at Montpellier and later (1839) vicar-general at Aix. Consecrated Bishop of Grenoble in 1853, he was appointed the following year assistant to the pontifical throne, and knight of the Legion of Honour.

At the Council of the Vatican, Ginoulhiac spoke publicly on philosophical errors (30 December 1869), on the rule of faith (22 March and 1 April 1870), and on the pope's infallibility (23 May and 28 June 1870). On this latter point he sided with the minority and left Rome before the session of 18 July, in which the doctrine was defined.

In 1870 he was transferred from Grenoble to the archiepiscopal See of Lyon. Fearing the Prussian invasion, the inhabitants of Lyon vowed to erect a basilica at Fourvières if the city were spared. The written pledge, signed by thousands of inhabitants, was placed on the altar of the Blessed Virgin by the archbishop himself. In 1873, in fulfillment of this promise, he laid the cornerstone of the edifice which stands on the hill of Fourvières.

While at Grenoble, Bishop Ginoulhiac wrote and published several letters and pastorals, especially on the condition of the Pontifical States (1860), on Ernest Renan's Life of Jesus (1863) and on the accusations of the press against the Encyclical of 8 December 1864 and the Syllabus (1865).

His works are "Histoire du dogme catholique pendant les trois premiers siècles de l' Eglise et jusqu'au concile de Nicée" (Paris, 1852, 1865); "Les épîtres pastorales, ou reflexions dogmatiques et morales sur les epitres de Saint Paul à Timothée et à Tite" (Paris, 1866); "Le concile oecuménique" (Paris, 1869); "Le sermon sur la montagne" (Lyons, 1872); "Les origines du christianisme", a posthumous work published by Canon Servonnet (Paris, 1878).

References
La France Ecclesiastique (Paris, 1876), 765-9
L'episcopat français (Paris, 1907).

External links

See also

 Our Lady of La Salette

1806 births
1875 deaths
Clergy from Montpellier
Ginoulhiac
Archbishops of Lyon
19th-century Roman Catholic archbishops in France
Our Lady of La Salette
19th-century French Roman Catholic bishops